Camila Andrea Pinzón Jiménez (born 10 May 1996) is a Colombian model and beauty pageant titleholder who was crowned Miss World Colombia 2022. Pinzón is the first delegate from Boyacá to ever be crowned Miss Mundo Colombia. She will represent Colombia in Miss World 2023.

Early life and education 
Camila was born on 10 May 1996 in Duitama, Boyacá to father Javier Pinzón and mother Camila Jiménez. She speaks Spanish, English, French and Italian. She completed her elementary and high school education at Colegio Campestre Suazapawa in Nobsa, Boyacá. Later, she lived between France and England studying her undergraduate and master's degrees in International business and Marketing at the Sorbonne University and Cambridge University.

Pageantry

Miss Universe Colombia 2021 
Camila participated in the 2nd edition of the Miss Universe Colombia contest that took place on Monday, 18 October 2021 at the Chamorro City Hall in the city of Bogotá, competing against 24 other applicants for the title where she achieved the Top 13; the winner of the contest was Valeria Ayos from Cartagena.

Miss World Colombia 2022 

Camila competed as the great favorite to win the contest; the final took place on 20 August 2022 at the Military Club of Army Officers in the city of Bogotá. At the end of the event, she was crowned Miss World Colombia 2022 by her predecessor, Andrea Aguilera from Antioquia. She will represent Colombia at Miss World 2023.

References

External links 
 

1996 births
Living people
Miss World 2022 delegates
Colombian female models 
Colombian beauty pageant winners